The 1998 Missouri Valley Conference men's basketball tournament was played after the conclusion of the 1997–1998 regular season at the Kiel Center in St. Louis, Missouri.

The Illinois State Redbirds defeated the Southwest Missouri State Bears in the championship game, 84–74, and as a result won their 4th MVC Tournament title and earned an automatic bid to the 1998 NCAA tournament. Dan Muller of Illinois State was named the tournament MVP.

Tournament Bracket

See also
 Missouri Valley Conference

References 

1997–98 Missouri Valley Conference men's basketball season
Missouri Valley Conference men's basketball tournament
1998 in sports in Missouri
College basketball tournaments in Missouri
Basketball competitions in St. Louis